The Rolleston River is a river of the West Coast Region of New Zealand's South Island. It flows north from its origins on the northern slopes of Mount Rolleston before turning northeast to reach the Otira River five kilometres north of Arthur's Pass.

See also
List of rivers of New Zealand

References

Rivers of the West Coast, New Zealand
Westland District
Rivers of New Zealand